Revelry was a cocktail bar and Korean restaurant in Portland, Oregon, United States.

Description
Revelry was located in southeast Portland's Buckman neighborhood, and served cocktails and Korean cuisine.

History
Revelry opened on August 16, 2016. Chefs and co-owners Rachel Yang and Seif Chirchi partnered with locals Eric and Karen Bowler. Revelry was named Portland Monthly "rising star restaurant". Diane Lam became chef in 2017. In November, the menu was updated to include more vegan options.

In June 2020, the owners announced plans to close permanently, during the COVID-19 pandemic. Revelry had attempted to operate via take-out during the pandemic.

Reception
In his review of the restaurant, Michael Russell of The Oregonian summarized, "Some eaters might find Revelry's fusion take on Korean cuisine to be too entry-level -- the menu has more in common with Tasty N Alder's Korean Fried Chicken bowl than it does with restaurants in Beaverton or Seoul. For those less familiar with galbi and dukbokki, this won't be a problem (and it doesn't stop much of the menu from being delicious)." Eater Portland Alex Frane included Revelry in his 2019 list of "18 Portland Bar Snacks Ideal for Any Night Out".

See also

 COVID-19 pandemic in Portland, Oregon
 History of Korean Americans in Portland, Oregon
 Impact of the COVID-19 pandemic on the restaurant industry in the United States
 List of defunct restaurants of the United States
 List of Korean restaurants

References

External links
 Revelry at Portland Monthly
 Revelry at Zagat

2016 establishments in Oregon
2020 disestablishments in Oregon
Buckman, Portland, Oregon
Defunct Asian restaurants in Portland, Oregon
Korean restaurants in the United States
Korean-American culture in Portland, Oregon
Restaurants disestablished during the COVID-19 pandemic
Restaurants disestablished in 2020
Restaurants established in 2016